Operation Geranium was a U.S. Army mission that dumped more than 3,000 tons of the chemical agent lewisite into the ocean off the Florida coast in 1948.

Operation
Operation Geranium occurred from 15 – 20 December 1948 and involved the dumping of approximately 3,150 tons of stockpiled lewisite into the Atlantic Ocean. "Geranium" was so called because lewisite has an odor reminiscent of geraniums. The materials dumped consisted of two types of bulk container, 60 were of the M14 variety, and another 3,700 bulk containers were dumped as well. The lewisite was shipped to Charleston from the Gulf Chemical Warfare Depot. The lewisite was then loaded aboard a World War II merchant ship, the SS Joshua Alexander. The lewisite was then dumped, at sea, 300 miles off the coast of Florida.

Dumping
Sea dumping was used by the U.S. Army to dispose of World War II lewisite stocks prior to Geranium. Before Operation Geranium, however, lewisite dumping was mostly accomplished by simply dropping loose munitions overboard. In this operation, the Army loaded the merchant hulk with the lewisite containers, sailed the vessel out to sea and then scuttled the ship with the munitions aboard. Most of the 20,000 tons of lewisite produced during World War II by the U.S. was disposed of by dumping at sea. This method of operation and disposal was not used again for some time, though the Army did employ it again.

See also
Operation CHASE

References

External links 
 Map of significant U.S. chemical agent dumps (Operation Geranium marked at F1)

Geranium
Geraniums
Geranium
1948 in the United States